Janani Janmabhoomi is a 1984 Telugu-language philosophical film produced by K. Kesava Rao under the Sri Bramharambika Films banner and directed by K. Viswanath.  It stars Nandamuri Balakrishna, Sumalatha, Satyanarayana, Sharada  and music composed by K. V. Mahadevan.

Plot
The film begins with Dhanjaya Rao, millionaire who is toffee-nosed, high-handed, and an atheist. His absences of consent to prayers & worship at home upsets his benevolent wife Katyayani. Plus, she is distraught for her two sons Ramesh & Suresh who are indulged by their father and turned into turpitudes.  Meanwhile, Ramesh moves abroad for his higher studies and returns after a few years. Suddenly, all are startled to view him as a true Indian when Katyayani is in jubilation. Then, he states that patriotism flourished in him after witnessing how foreigners worship their culture, customs & traditions and being conscious of the eminence of his country. 

Whereupon, Dhanjaya Rao rebukes, forasmuch what he learned is hardly stupidity & gullibility, and inquires him to comprehend the status quo. Parallelly, as an anecdote, Pammy breaks up with Ramesh by enforcement of her mother for his ongoing behavior. As of today, Ramesh proceeds to their village as a common man where he lookouts’ inequities, irregularities, and evils in society. At that point, he is acquainted with a local lass Satyavati who careers in saree weaving and endears her. Ramesh spots damn many in that profession going along thrall of mediator Abbaiah Naidu and attempts to hinder him. As a result, he has been thrashed and kicked out. Since the return, Ramesh mentions to his father that what he said is correct and concurrently he decided to watch over their cement factory at the very spot. 

Now Ramesh is back in the village Suresh also aids his brother in his style. They make meteoritic changes by forming an association to relieve the saree-weaving pros from the evil clutches of Abbaiah Naidu, bringing soul-searching in the youth manipulated by dirty politicians. All of them act together to transform the terrain by constructing Roads, wells, toilets, etc. Presently, Dhanjaya Rao ploys to acquire a huge dam project mutually Ramesh designed it for the welfare of desperate prime by forming a land army for which Jagannatha Rao also strongholds. Moreover, Katyayani files a complaint against the barbarities of her husband to triumph aim of Ramesh when Govt appoints a special team. Here Dhanjaya Rao ruses to slaughter them and seeks to force Katyayani for withdrawing the complaint. At last, tragically, Suresh also dies with the team which reforms Dhanjaya Rao. Finally, the movie ends with a proclamation that Nevermind if you are not patriotic but not implant and screw up your children’s mindset. Do not scapegoat them in political chess. If the youth stems from disappointment and despondency they will only build the ideal society. Hail to the Mother & the Motherland.

Cast

Nandamuri Balakrishna as Ramesh 
Sumalatha as Padmini / Pammy
Rajyalakshmi as Satyavathi
Satyanarayana as Dhanjaya Rao
Sharada as Kachyayani
Subhalekha Sudhakar as Suresh 
P. J. Sarma as Jaganath Rao
Sakshi Ranga Rao as Post Master Govindaiah
Gokina Rama Rao as Abbaiah Naidu
Bheemeswara Rao as Dhanjaya Rao's Partner
Potti Prasad as Driver
Malladi as Musalaiah
Jit Mohan Mitra as Kallukottu Owner 
Dham as Avataram
Rama Prabha as Pammy's mother
Dubbing Janaki as Nurse

Soundtrack

Music composed by K. V. Mahadevan was released on Supreme Music. Lyrics were written by Veturi and Sirivennela Seetharama Sastry. Sastry was credited as CH. Seetharama Sastry (Bharani) in this film.

Notes

References

External links
 

1984 films
Films directed by K. Viswanath
Films scored by K. V. Mahadevan
1980s Telugu-language films